The following lists events that happened during 2023 in the Republic of Singapore.

Incumbents 
 President: Halimah Yacob 
 Prime Minister: Lee Hsien Loong

Events  
Below, events for the COVID-19 pandemic in Singapore have the "CP" prefix.

January 
 1 January – The Goods and Services Tax is raised from 7 to 8 per cent.
 3 January – Jurong Bird Park is officially closed after exactly 52 years since its opening.
 4 January – 
 HomeTeamNS Bedok Reservoir clubhouse is officially opened. The clubhouse features an indoor water theme park.
 Appointments are no longer needed for individuals to get their Covid-19 vaccinations and boosters at any Joint Testing and Vaccination Centres (JTVC) or Children Vaccination Centre (CVC).
 9 January – SPH Media Trust's circulation figures were reported to be inflated by about 10 to 12 per cent during a review triggered by the restructuring of the company. It comes a day after an online news media source leaked out.
10 January - The revamped Admiralty Place in Woodlands, Singapore is reopened after 4 years of renovation. 
 13 January – Construction starts on the Jurong Region Line.
 16 January –
Mediacorp begins soft-launching its new unified branding across television, radio and digital media products (except CNA and CNA938) while also being teased on their social media accounts, with the inclusion of the "M" prefix to signify their recognition in the digital-first environment. The Mplifier branding takes effect full-time on 1 February.
Grab relaunches carpooling service GrabShare for a two-week period from certain locations.
 18 January – Construction starts on the first phase of the Cross Island Line.
 19 January – New support centre, SheCares@SCWO, for girls and women who face online harassment opens in Waterloo Street. 
 31 January – SMSes from organisations not in central registry to be labelled as 'likely scam'.

February 
 7 February – CapitaLand announced plans to redevelop JCube into a 40-storey residential complex with two levels of commercial shops by 2027. As a result, JCube will shut on 6 August.
 9 February – CP: Plans are announced to move Singapore from DORSCON Level Yellow to Green from 13 February. There will be no mandatory masking on public transport and some healthcare areas, unless if visiting vulnerable patients. There will be no negative tests and insurance required for unvaccinated travellers, with the Popular Places Passes system in four locations for migrant workers scrapped. TraceTogether and SafeEntry are discontinued with all data deleted (with the exception of a murder case in 2020), with the possibility of reactivation if necessary. A token return scheme will be conducted from 13 February to 12 March. People can isolate in dormitories from 1 March. Protocols 1-2-3 are also scrapped, with fees for tests and treatment to start 1 April (no more full subsidies), as well as fees for using Community Treatment Facilities. Vaccinations will continue to be free for citizens, permanent residents, long-term and some short-term pass holders. New vaccination guidelines are also released, with a minimum of three doses (two primary and one booster) and children only requiring two doses. Those vulnerable are encouraged to get boosters. MCs will no longer differentiate between COVID and other respiratory diseases. There will also be an after-action review, with a report on COVID-19 pandemic management to be released and debated in Parliament. Finally, the Multi-Ministry Task Force will stand down, with the Ministry of Health taking charge. Should there be a need, a new multi-agency crisis management structure can be reactivated.
 13 February – CP: DORSCON Level Yellow reduced to Green.
 17 February - The revamped Peranakan Museum is officially reopened to the public after nearly four years of renovation works.
 19 February - The new Tampines Viaduct is officially opened after a delay caused by a collapse in 2017 which killed one worker and injured ten workers.

March 
 6 March - Sengkang Grand Mall which is located outside Buangkok MRT Station is officially opened. Buangkok Integrated Transport Hub will be opened in the third quarter of the year.
 8 March - CP: A White Paper on Singapore’s Response to COVID-19 is released, setting out seven recommendations to boost preparedness for a future pandemic.

Predicted and scheduled events 
Mid 2023 - The first new set of Alstom Movia CR151 train would be debuted on service on the North South and East West Line.
- Mandai Bird Paradise (Formerly Jurong Bird Park) is officially opened as a new bird park in Mandai Wildlife Reserve.

Deaths 

 3 January – Eric Low, former PAP politician (b. 1948).
 4 January – Sim Wong Hoo, founder of Creative Technology (b. 1955).
 7 January – William S. W. Lim, architect (Marine Parade Community Building, People's Park Complex, Golden Mile Complex) (b. 1932).
 9 January - Timothy Nga, Singaporean actor and celebrity (b. 1973).

References

 
2020s in Singapore
Years of the 21st century in Singapore
Singapore
Singapore